The Ireland women's national basketball team represents Ireland in international women's basketball. The team is organised by Basketball Ireland, and play their home games at the National Basketball Arena in Tallaght. 

In February 2010, during the Irish financial crisis, Basketball Ireland announced that it was €1.2m in debt and would deactivate its senior international squads to cut costs. A team representing Ireland was reformed in 2013, when a "Premier League All Stars" team played Wales in a match to mark The Gathering Ireland 2013 festival. Ireland also competed in 3x3 basketball at the 2014 Europe Championships and the 2015 European Games. In late 2015, it was announced that the national team would again join official FIBA Europe competitions after accepting an invitation to play the 2016 FIBA Women's European Championship for Small Countries. The Irish team came second in the 2016 event, after losing to Malta in the final. An Irish team also entered the 2018 event (which took place in Cork) and placed sixth.

Squad
As of mid-2019 (June 2019 friendly series), the squad included:
 Aine McKenna, Ambassador UCC Glanmire
 Aine O'Connor, Courtyard Liffey Celtics
 Aisling McCann, Pyrobel Killester
 Anna Kelly, Visby Ladies (Sweden)
 Anna Maguire, Houston Baptist University (US)
 Cathy Kavanagh, WIT Wildcats
 Claire Rockall, Maree
 Edel Thornton, Trinity Meteors
 Fiona Scally, Maree
 Grainne Dwyer, Fr. Mathews
 Hannah Thornton, Pyrobel Killester

See also
Ireland women's national under-18 basketball team
Ireland women's national under-16 basketball team
Ireland women's national 3x3 team

References

External links
Official website 
Ireland at FIBA site
Ireland National Team – Women at Eurobasket.com

 
Women's national basketball teams